Opportunity finance refers to socially responsible investing by an institution in an organization or group of individuals.

Usage of the term 

The Opportunity Finance Network, a Philadelphia-based national umbrella group of 213  community development financial institution (CDFIs) founded in 1995, defines the term as "a category of financing that helps people and communities just outside the margins of conventional, mainstream finance join the economic mainstream—and helps the economic mainstream enter emerging opportunity markets." It is closely related to microfinance, but tends to occur on a larger scale and be more explicitly concerned with social benefit.

The concept of opportunity finance has gained increased traction in recent years, both from political movements and economic necessity. The current economic climate in the United States has raised the demand for creative financing even for established businesses, as traditional bank loans for nonprofits and small businesses became harder to come by after the market crashed in the autumn of 2008.

Although the concept of opportunity finance is applicable worldwide, the entrepreneurial connotations of the term make it most commonly applied to initiatives within the United States. The Opportunity Finance Network, itself a U.S. organization, connects the concept to individualism and "the bedrock of U.S. policy."

Opportunity finance and CDFIs 

Community Development Financial Institutions (CDFIs) are nongovernmental financing entities (such as banks and loan funds) with the primary mission of community development, serving a target market, providing development services, and remaining accountable to their communities. CDFIs may be the most well-known practitioners of opportunity finance in the United States, because they comprise a group of government-accredited institutions. Some awards for opportunity finance are available to CDFIs only.

While there are numerous organizations certified as CDFIs by the CDFI Fund, it is believed that there are thousands of financial institutions serving the needs of low-income people or communities in the U.S., but either have not applied for CDFI status or have otherwise not been able to fulfill all of the requirements for formal CDFI certification. All of these organizations can be said to be engaged in opportunity finance, despite their lack of U.S. governmental recognition.

Examples of opportunity finance organizations

Europe 
 Actis Capital *

United States 
 Accion USA
 Community loan funds, such as:
 Chicago Community Loan Fund
Grassroots Business Fund

Worldwide 
 Heifer International>

See also

 Socially responsible investing
 Ethical banking
 Microfinance

External links
 Opportunity Finance Network website
 CDFI Fund
 Wells Fargo NEXT Awards for Opportunity Finance
 Financial Times Sustainable Banking Awards
 "Money for SBA initiatives may loosen credit for small firms to grow," Chicago Tribune, March 23, 2009

References

Social economy
Community development